Holly Marie Willoughby (born 10 February 1981) is an English television presenter, author and model. She is currently the co-presenter of ITV's This Morning (2009–present) and Dancing on Ice (2006–2011, 2018–present) alongside Phillip Schofield.

From 2008 to 2020, Willoughby was a team captain on the ITV2 comedy panel show Celebrity Juice. Her other television work includes The Xtra Factor (2008–2009), Text Santa (2011–2013, 2015), The Voice UK (2012–2013), Surprise Surprise (2012–2015), Play to the Whistle (2015–2017), I'm a Celebrity...Get Me Out of Here! (2018), Freeze the Fear with Wim Hof (2022), and The Games (2022).

Early life
Willoughby was born in Brighton, East Sussex, the younger of two daughters of Brian Willoughby, a sales manager of a double-glazing company, and Linda Willoughby (née Fleming), a former air stewardess. She was educated at the independent Burgess Hill Girls in the town of Burgess Hill in West Sussex, and The College of Richard Collyer in Horsham.

In 1995, at the age of 14, Willoughby was spotted by talent scouts at The Clothes Show Live exhibition and signed with the model agency, Storm Management. She appeared in teen magazines for girls such as Mizz, Just Seventeen, Shout, and More!. From 1998, at the age of 17, Willoughby started modelling bras, underwear and tights for clients including Pretty Polly, appearing in advertisements and posters.

Career

2000–2005: Children's presenting
In 2000, Willoughby won an audition for a show on CITV featuring S Club 7 called S Club TV. In this show actors represented an alternative S Club. She also appeared in a show called S Club 7: Artistic Differences playing a character called Zoe with the regular members of the band. Willoughby worked as a receptionist for a while and then as a runner for the defunct shopping channel Auction World TV.

Willoughby also took on menial jobs and started an Open University course in psychotherapy. Then eventually, she found work as assistant manager during which time she persuaded a friend to make a showreel of her. This secured her an agent who then contacted the BBC. Later in 2002, Willoughby presented a factual entertainment programme for children called Xchange and went on to host several other children's shows for CBBC: X-perimental and CBBC at the Fame Academy (CBBC's version of the BBC talent show Fame Academy).

Willoughby's first role as a children's entertainer came when she rejoined CITV in 2004 to co-present the entertainment show Ministry of Mayhem which aired on Saturday mornings. On this programme she met her future husband Dan Baldwin, one of the show's producers. In 2006, the show's title was changed to Holly & Stephen's Saturday Showdown in order to reflect the popularity of its co-presenters, Willoughby and Stephen Mulhern.

In 2005, Willoughby presented Feel the Fear, a children's entertainment programme in which the presenters are set unnerving challenges. She has also had a number of minor appearances on other children's programmes. Willoughby presented CD:UK for a short while in the spring of 2005, replacing Cat Deeley before Myleene Klass, Lauren Laverne and Johny Pitts became the regular presenters. In recognition of work as a children's television presenter, Willoughby won a BAFTA Children's Award in 2006.

2006–2008

In 2006, she was chosen to co-present, with Phillip Schofield, the television show Dancing on Ice, in which celebrities are partnered with professional dancers to learn ice-dancing routines which are judged by a panel of experts and voted on by audiences. Willoughby remained in the role until 2011 due to new commitments. She was replaced by Christine Lampard.

Willoughby has presented a number of other ITV programmes, including spin-off shows such as Celebrity Wrestling: Bring It On in 2005, Greased Lightnin' in 2007 and The Xtra Factor for two years in 2008 and 2009.

In 2007, she took over from Davina McCall as the presenter of Streetmate, a dating game show during its transition from Channel 4 to ITV2. Willoughby hosted the show for its final series. In the same year, Willoughby co-presented Holly & Fearne Go Dating with Fearne Cotton. The show saw the two hosts attempt to find dates for single people that they meet around the UK.

Since 2008, Willoughby appeared as a team captain on Celebrity Juice, presenting series 1–11 and 13–23 (taking a break in series 12 due to maternity leave). She left the show after 12 years in May 2020.

2009–present
Willoughby has co-presented ITV's This Morning with Phillip Schofield since September 2009 replacing Fern Britton. Willoughby and Schofield present the programme from Monday to Thursday mornings.

In 2011, Willoughby co-presented charity telethon Text Santa with Ant & Dec. She returned to co-host the show with Phillip Schofield in 2012, 2013 and 2015.

On 24 March 2012, Willoughby began presenting The Voice UK with Reggie Yates. She decided to leave the show after the second series and was replaced by Emma Willis in 2014.

In 2012, Willoughby began hosting a revived version of Surprise Surprise. A second series began airing on 15 September 2013, a third on 22 October 2014 and a fourth on 21 June 2015.

Willoughby has written a series of children's books with her sister Kelly. Their debut book School for Stars: First Term at L'Etoile became the UK's highest-selling children's book of 2013.

In 2015, Willoughby presented the sports-based panel show Play to the Whistle on ITV. The first series aired for seven episodes beginning on 11 April 2015. A second series aired for six episodes, beginning in April 2016 and a third series aired in 2017.

In 2016, Willoughby presented primetime Saturday night dating show Meet the Parents for ITV. The show has been compared to Blind Date.

In August 2017, it was reported Willoughby had received a £200,000 pay rise to match the salary of her co-host Phillip Schofield. She returned to present the new series of Dancing on Ice with Schofield in January 2018.

In August 2018, it was announced that Willoughby would host the eighteenth series of I'm a Celebrity...Get Me Out of Here! alongside Declan Donnelly as his usual partner Anthony McPartlin took a year-long break.

Willoughby is a brand ambassador for Marks & Spencer and Garnier, and a former ambassador for Diet Coke in the UK.

In September 2021, Willoughby founded a wellness and lifestyle brand and company called Wylde Moon.

Queen Elizabeth II lying in state
On 17 September 2022, Willoughby and Phillip Schofield drew criticism for not joining The Queue with the public, when filming for This Morning at the lying in state of Queen Elizabeth II in Westminster Hall. ITV said that they were escorted from the press gallery by government staff, and did not file past the Queen's coffin. Social media users contrasted this against the actions of other celebrities such as David Beckham and Susanna Reid, who queued for many hours with members of the general public.

Personal life
Willoughby is dyslexic. Her sister, Kelly, also works in the television industry.

On 4 August 2007, Willoughby married Dan Baldwin, co-founder of Hungry Bear Media and a former producer on Ministry of Mayhem and later executive producer on Celebrity Juice. They live in Barnes, London and have two sons and a daughter. Their first child was born on 11 May 2009, their second was born on 14 April 2011, and their third was born on 29 September 2014.

In 2008, Willoughby became a patron of the charity Together for Short Lives.

Filmography

Television

Film

Bibliography
 The Best Friends' Guide to Life (with Fearne Cotton, Vermilion, 2010) 
 Truly Happy Baby (June 2016) 
 Truly Scrumptious Baby (September 2017) 
 Reflections (October 2021)

School for Stars series
All books written with Kelly Willoughby
 L 'Etoile, School for Stars: First Term (2013) 
 Second Term at L 'Etoile (2013) 
 Third Term at L 'Etoile (2014) 
 Summer Holiday Mystery (2014) 
 Double Trouble at L 'Etoile (2015) 
 The Missing Ballerina Mystery (2015)

References

External links

 
 

1981 births
Living people
Alumni of the Open University
People educated at Burgess Hill School
People educated at The College of Richard Collyer
21st-century English women writers
British women children's writers
English children's writers
English television presenters
BAFTA winners (people)
English non-fiction writers
People from Brighton
English female models
Television presenters with dyslexia